American singer-songwriter and actress Olivia Rodrigo has received numerous accolades; including three Grammy Awards, seven Billboard Music Awards, four MTV Video Music Awards, four iHeartRadio Music Awards and two People's Choice Awards, an American Music Award, a Brit Award and a Juno Award. 

Rodrigo was named Time 'Entertainer of the Year' and was included in the 2021' Time 100 Next list. She was named Music Week 'Artist of Year' in 2021, and was honored as Billboard  'Woman of the Year' in 2022. The Ivors Academy considered her as the biggest Songwriter on the planet in 2021. She was awarded as 'Songwriter of the Year' by Variety and at the 2022 ASCAP Pop Music Awards. Rodrigo joined the elite list of Forbes 30 Under 30, Fortune 40 Under 40 and Bloomberg 50 ranking as one of the most influential people in global business.

Awards and nominations

Other accolades

World records

Listicles

See also
Grammy Award recordsArtists who had been nominated for all four General Field awards in one night

Notes

References 

Lists of awards received by American musician
Lists of awards received by American actor
Olivia Rodrigo